Kursaal is an original novel written by Peter Anghelides and based on the long-running British science fiction television series Doctor Who. It features the Eighth Doctor and Sam.

The word Kursaal means a public hall or room, for the use of visitors at watering places and health resorts in Germany; German kur (from Latin cūra: cure) + saal: hall, room.

Premise
Kursaal is a pleasure world, a huge theme park for the Cronus Systemor rather it will be if it isn't destroyed during construction. Eco-terrorists want the project halted to preserve vital archaeological sites containing the last remains of the long-dead Jax, an ancient wolf-like race.

Sam falls in with the environmentalists, and finds her loyalties divided. The Doctor's own investigations lead him to believe the Jax are not extinct after all. Cut off from the TARDIS, separated from his companion and pursued for murder, the Doctor discovers Kursaal hides a terrible secret.

See also

Werewolf (Doctor Who)

External links
The Cloister Library - Kursaal

1998 British novels
1998 science fiction novels
Eighth Doctor Adventures
Werewolf novels